Crenicichla is a genus of cichlids native to South America commonly known as the pike cichlids. They are found in most tropical and subtropical freshwater habitats between the Andes and the Atlantic.

Description
Like many other predatory fishes, a pike cichlid has a wide mouth and elongated body.

Distribution and ecology 

The genus Crenicichla is native to freshwater in tropical and subtropical South America east of the Andes, ranging from Trinidad and the Guiana Shield (including Orinoco), through the Amazon and Río de la Plata Basins, south as far as Río Negro in Argentina. Although widespread as a group, the individual species are often restricted to a single river or river basin. They are found in a wide range of habitats, including rivers, streams, pools and lakes; some species are rheophilic.

The vast majority of pike cichlids are predatory and feed on fish, insects, and other small animals. They usually place themselves where they can stay undetected by the prey, like close to a sunken tree stem or behind a rock. This behavior, as well as the correspondingly adapted shape, which resembles that the unrelated pikes (Esocidae) of the Holarctic, gives the pike cichlids their common name. An exception is C. tapii, which is similar in general appearance to other pike cichlids, but unusual for being gregarious and feeding on periphyton.

Species
There are currently around 93 recognized species in this genus:

 Crenicichla acutirostris Günther, 1862
 Crenicichla adspersa Heckel, 1840
 Crenicichla albopunctata Pellegrin, 1904
 Crenicichla alta C. H. Eigenmann, 1912 
 Crenicichla anamiri P. M. M. Ito & Rapp Py-Daniel, 2015  
 Crenicichla anthurus Cope, 1872
 Crenicichla brasiliensis (Bloch, 1792)
 Crenicichla britskii S. O. Kullander, 1982
 Crenicichla cametana Steindachner, 1911
 Crenicichla celidochilus Casciotta, 1987
 Crenicichla chicha H. R. Varella, S. O. Kullander & F. C. T. Lima, 2012 
 Crenicichla cincta Regan, 1905
 Crenicichla compressiceps Ploeg, 1986
 Crenicichla coppenamensis Ploeg, 1987
 Crenicichla cyanonotus Cope, 1870
 Crenicichla cyclostoma Ploeg, 1986
 Crenicichla empheres C. A. S. de Lucena, 2007
 Crenicichla frenata T. N. Gill, 1858
 Crenicichla gaucho C. A. S. de Lucena & S. O. Kullander, 1992
 Crenicichla geayi Pellegrin, 1903 (Half-banded pike cichlid)
 Crenicichla gillmorlisi S. O. Kullander & C. A. S. de Lucena, 2013  
 Crenicichla hadrostigma C. A. S. de Lucena, 2007
 Crenicichla haroldoi Luengo & Britski, 1974
 Crenicichla heckeli Ploeg, 1989
 Crenicichla hemera S. O. Kullander, 1990
 Crenicichla hu Piálek, Říčan, Casciotta & Almirón, 2010
 Crenicichla hummelincki Ploeg, 1991
 Crenicichla igara C. A. S. de Lucena & S. O. Kullander, 1992
 Crenicichla iguapina S. O. Kullander & C. A. S. de Lucena, 2006 
 Crenicichla iguassuensis Haseman, 1911
 Crenicichla inpa Ploeg, 1991
 Crenicichla isbrueckeri Ploeg, 1991
 Crenicichla jaguarensis Haseman, 1911
 Crenicichla jegui Ploeg, 1986
 Crenicichla johanna Heckel, 1840
 Crenicichla jupiaensis Britski & Luengo, 1968
 Crenicichla jurubi C. A. S. de Lucena & S. O. Kullander, 1992
 Crenicichla labrina (Spix & Agassiz, 1831)
 Crenicichla lacustris (Castelnau, 1855)
 Crenicichla lenticulata Heckel, 1840
 Crenicichla lepidota Heckel, 1840 (Pike cichlid)
 Crenicichla lucenai Mattos, I. Schindler, Ottoni & Cheffe, 2014 
 Crenicichla lucius Cope, 1870
 Crenicichla lugubris Heckel, 1840
 Crenicichla macrophthalma Heckel, 1840
 Crenicichla maculata S. O. Kullander & C. A. S. de Lucena, 2006 
 Crenicichla mandelburgeri S. O. Kullander, 2009
 Crenicichla marmorata Pellegrin, 1904
 Crenicichla menezesi Ploeg, 1991
 Crenicichla minuano C. A. S. de Lucena & S. O. Kullander, 1992
 Crenicichla missioneira C. A. S. de Lucena & S. O. Kullander, 1992
 Crenicichla monicae S. O. Kullander & H. R. Varella, 2015 (Wallace’s pike cichlid)  
 Crenicichla mucuryna R. Ihering (pt), 1914
 Crenicichla multispinosa Pellegrin, 1903
 Crenicichla nickeriensis Ploeg, 1987
 Crenicichla niederleinii (Holmberg, 1891)
 Crenicichla notophthalmus Regan, 1913
 Crenicichla pellegrini Ploeg, 1991
 Crenicichla percna S. O. Kullander, 1991
 Crenicichla phaiospilus S. O. Kullander, 1991
 Crenicichla ploegi H. R. Varella, Loeb, F. C. T. Lima & S. O. Kullander, 2018
 Crenicichla prenda C. A. S. de Lucena & S. O. Kullander, 1992
 Crenicichla proteus Cope, 1872
 Crenicichla punctata R. F. Hensel, 1870
 Crenicichla pydanielae Ploeg, 1991
 Crenicichla regani Ploeg, 1989
 Crenicichla reticulata (Heckel, 1840)
 Crenicichla rosemariae S. O. Kullander, 1997
 Crenicichla santosi Ploeg, 1991
 Crenicichla saxatilis (Linnaeus, 1758) (Ring-tail pike cichlid)
 Crenicichla scottii (C. H. Eigenmann, 1907)
 Crenicichla sedentaria S. O. Kullander, 1986
 Crenicichla semicincta Steindachner, 1892
 Crenicichla semifasciata (Heckel, 1840)
 Crenicichla sipaliwini Ploeg, 1987
 Crenicichla stocki Ploeg, 1991
 Crenicichla strigata Günther, 1862
 Crenicichla sveni Ploeg, 1991
 Crenicichla taikyra Casciotta, Almirón, Aichino, S. E. Gómez, Piálek, & Říčan, 2013 
 Crenicichla tapii Piálek, Dragová, Casciotta, Almirón & Říčan, 2015 
 Crenicichla tendybaguassu C. A. S. de Lucena & S. O. Kullander, 1992
 Crenicichla ternetzi Norman, 1926
 Crenicichla tesay Casciotta & Almirón, 2009
 Crenicichla tigrina Ploeg, Jégu & E. J. G. Ferreira, 1991
 Crenicichla tingui S. O. Kullander & C. A. S. de Lucena, 2006 
 Crenicichla tuca Piálek, Dragová, Casciotta, Almirón & Říčan, 2015 
 Crenicichla urosema S. O. Kullander, 1990
 Crenicichla vaillanti Pellegrin, 1903
 Crenicichla virgatula Ploeg, 1991
 Crenicichla vittata Heckel, 1840
 Crenicichla wallacii Regan, 1905
 Crenicichla yaha Casciotta, Almirón & S. E. Gómez, 2006 
 Crenicichla ypo Casciotta, Almirón, Piálek, S. E. Gómez & Říčan, 2010
 Crenicichla zebrina C. G. Montaña, López-Fernández & Taphorn, 2008

In addition to these, several undescribed species are known.

References

 
Geophagini
Cichlid fish of South America
Cichlid genera
Taxa named by Johann Jakob Heckel